Manisha Panchakam is a stotra containing five verses (slokas) composed by Shri Adi Shankaracharya, the Hindu philosopher. It is said that in these five verses Shankara brings out the essence of Advaita Vedanta.

The word Manisha means firm conviction, and Panchak means five. So the name of the stotra can be translated as "Five verses of firm conviction". Adi Shankara wrote the Manisha Panchakam at Varanasi (Kashi/Benaras), the ancient sacred city of India, and the home to the famous Kashi Visvanatha temple.

Origin 

According to the story, Adi Shankaraachaarya, was on his way to the temple after finishing his bath in Ganga, when he came across a chandaala (an outcaste) and his four dogs. He asked the chandaala to move away from him, as was the custom in those days, to which the chandaala questioned him in two Sanskrit verses - 

Shankara replied to the questions in five verses and touched the feet of Chandala, as a way to  show respect towards him.

Manisha Panchakam 

First Verse - 

Second Verse -

 

Third Verse -

Fourth Verse -

The word manisha appears in the last line in all the five Verdes. Manisha Panchakam conveys the message that  the Paramatman (consciousness) is same within all beings regardless bodily distinctions of caste. Once a person has attained Self-knowledge, considerations such as his caste are totally irrelevant.

References

External links
 —Sanskrit text with English translation
 Links to the works of Shankaracharya

தமிழில் படிக்க 
 மனிஷா பஞ்சகம் புத்தகம்

Sanskrit poetry
Adi Shankara
Advaita Vedanta texts